David Klemmer (born 22 December 1993) is an Australian professional rugby league footballer who plays as a  for the Wests Tigers in the NRL and Australia international level.

He previously played for the Canterbury-Bankstown Bulldogs and the Newcastle Knights in the NRL. Klemmer has played for City Origin and New South Wales in the State of Origin series.

Background
Klemmer was born in Sydney, New South Wales, Australia and is of German descent.

He played his junior rugby league for the All Saints Toongabbie Tigers, before being signed by the Canterbury-Bankstown Bulldogs. He also played Australian rules football and played for the Sydney Swans academy.

Playing career
At 15 years of age, Klemmer signed with the Canterbury-Bankstown Bulldogs. In 2010 and 2011, Klemmer played for the Australian Schoolboys. In 2011, Klemmer also played for the New South Wales under 18s team.

He played for Canterbury-Bankstown's NYC team in 2011 and 2012, scoring 6 tries in 28 games.

In 2012, Klemmer was named on the interchange bench for New South Wales in the inaugural under 20s State of Origin match at Penrith Stadium. 

At the end of 2012, Klemmer was named NYC Player of the Year and also named at starting  in the 2012 NYC Team of the Year.

2013
On 5 March 2013, Klemmer re-signed with the Canterbury-Bankstown club on a three-year contract. In round 1 of the 2013 NRL season, Klemmer made his NRL debut for Canterbury-Bankstown against the North Queensland Cowboys off the interchange bench in Canterbury's 12-24 loss at Central Coast Stadium. In round 3, against the Melbourne Storm at AAMI Park, Klemmer made headlines after he was at the end of receiving a high flying karate style kick from Melbourne's fullback Billy Slater to the head in Canterbury's 18-22 loss. 

On 20 April 2013, Klemmer was named captain of the New South Wales team in the under 20s State of Origin match, leading the team to a 36-12 victory over Queensland at Penrith Stadium. Klemmer debut season ended early after he sustained a knee injury. Klemmer finished his debut year with him playing 4 matches for Canterbury-Bankstown.

2014
In round 4 against the Melbourne Storm, Klemmer scored his first NRL career try in the Canterbury club's 40-12 win at nib Stadium in Perth. On 26 April 2014, Klemmer was selected to play for City Origin for the City vs Country Origin match at Apex Oval in Dubbo. Klemmer played off the interchange bench in the 26-all draw on 4 May 2014. On 5 October 2014, in Canterbury's 2014 NRL Grand Final against the South Sydney Rabbitohs, Klemmer played off the bench in the club's 6-30 loss. Klemmer finished the Canterbury club's 2014 season with him playing 23 matches and scoring a try. Klemmer made his international debut for Australia, playing against England at AAMI Park in Australia’s 16-12 win.

2015
In round 5 of the 2015 NRL season, in the Grand Final re-match against the South Sydney Rabbitohs, Klemmer was sin binned after crowding in on referee Gerard Sutton alongside Canterbury captain James Graham and yelling "You're off your f***ing face". The Canterbury club were leading 17-16 at the time, but lost 17-18 at ANZ Stadium. After full-time was blown, some members of the Canterbury fan base pelted referee Gerard Sutton and match officials with plastic bottles, causing an investigation to find out and ban the misbehaving members from attending rugby league matches for life. Klemmer was later hit with a three-week suspension for contrary conduct. He returned in round 9, against the North Queensland Cowboys, in Canterbury's 23-16 loss at 1300SMILES Stadium. On 3 May, Klemmer played for New South Wales City, playing at prop in the 34-22 loss to New South Wales Country at Wagga Wagga. On 27 May, he was selected to make his State of Origin debut for New South Wales in game 1 against Queensland. He played of the interchange bench in the Blues' 11-10 loss at ANZ Stadium. In game 2 of the 2015 State of Origin series, he again made headlines after a heated exchange with the oldest member of the Queensland team, Corey Parker. Parker told Klemmer (the youngest member of the New South Wales team) to "show some respect" and Klemmer replied "get f***d you c**t". Klemmer also played in game 3, off the interchange bench, in the Blues' 52-6 record loss at Suncorp Stadium. He finished off the 2015 season having played in 21 matches and scoring a try for Canterbury-Bankstown.

2016
On 22 May 2016, Klemmer extended his contract with Canterbury-Bankstown until the end of the 2020 season. Klemmer played in all 3 matches for New South Wales off the interchange bench in the Blues 2-1 series loss in the 2016 State of Origin series. After Game 2, Klemmer got into some trouble after the Blues 26-16 loss to Queensland after he punched a wall in frustration in the toilets off the Suncorp Stadium changing rooms. Klemmer finished the 2016 NRL season with him playing in 22 matches and scoring a try for Canterbury-Bankstown. On 24 September 2016, Klemmer played for Prime Minister's XIII against Papua New Guinea, playing off the interchange bench in the 58-0 win at Port Moresby. 

On 3 October 2016, Klemmer was selected in the 24-man Australian Kangaroos squad for the 2016 Four Nations. Klemmer played in all 5 matches of the tournament, including playing off the interchange bench in the Kangaroos 34-8 Four Nations final win against New Zealand at Anfield.

2017
In February, Klemmer was selected in Canterbury's 2017 NRL Auckland Nines squad. On 5 May, he played for Australia in the 2017 ANZAC Test where he started at prop in the 30-12 win at Canberra Stadium. In June 2017, it was rumoured that Klemmer requested a release from his contract from Canterbury-Bankstown due to a financial dispute stemming from his decision to split with long-time manager David Riolo. Klemmer later commented saying that he never wanted to leave Canterbury. For the 2017 State of Origin series, Klemmer played in all 3 matches off the interchange bench in the Blues 2-1 series loss. In the lead-up to Game 3, Klemmer was set to start at prop by coach Laurie Daley and with Andrew Fifita to come off the bench but rumours that Fifita blew up at Daley about the switch and he later reversed that decision and the Blues would later go on to lose the match 22-6. Klemmer was named as the winner of the Brad Fittler Medal for being the Blues Best Player of the series. Klemmer was the second player to receive the award by playing all 3 matches of the interchange bench. Klemmer finished the 2017 NRL season with him playing in 21 matches and scoring 1 try for the Bulldogs. On 3 October 2017, Klemmer was selected in the 24-man Australia Kangaroos 2017 Rugby League World Cup squad. Klemmer played in all 6 matches of the tournament, including starting at prop in the World Cup Final match against England in the hard fought 6-0 victory at Suncorp Stadium.

2018
In 2018, Klemmer was selected to play for New South Wales in the 2018 State of Origin series which The Blues emerged victorious winning 2-1.  In game 3, Klemmer was placed on report for an attempted trip on Queensland player Ben Hunt. Klemmer was later fined $1350 but escaped suspension.

Late in the year, Klemmer asked for a release from the final two years of his Canterbury contract. He was granted the release in November, signing a five-year contract with the Newcastle Knights starting in 2019.

2019
On 7 October 2019, Klemmer was named in the Australian side for the upcoming Oceania Cup fixtures.

2020
Klemmer played 21 games for Newcastle in the 2020 NRL season. He played in Newcastle's first finals game since 2013 which was a 46-20 loss against South Sydney in the elimination final.

2021
Klemmer made 21 appearances for Newcastle in the 2021 NRL season as the club qualified for the finals. Klemmer played in Newcastle's elimination final loss to Parramatta.

2022
In round 17 of the 2022 NRL season, Klemmer was sent off in Newcastle's 40-28 loss to South Sydney.
On 2 August, Klemmer was stood down by the Newcastle club for an on-field incident which happened during the clubs round 20 loss to Canterbury. It was alleged that Klemmer refused to be substituted towards the end of the match and verbally abused a Newcastle trainer.
On 16 November, Klemmer joined the Wests Tigers on a three-year deal in a player swap with Jackson Hastings.

References

External links

Newcastle Knights profile
Canterbury Bulldogs profile
NRL profile
2017 RLWC profile

 

1993 births
Living people
Australia national rugby league team players
Australian people of German descent
Australian rugby league players
Canterbury-Bankstown Bulldogs players
Newcastle Knights players
Wests Tigers players
New South Wales Rugby League State of Origin players
New South Wales City Origin rugby league team players
Prime Minister's XIII players
Junior Kangaroos players
Rugby league players from Sydney
Rugby league props
Rugby league locks